Erugomicula is a genus of testate lobose amoebae found in the order Arcellinida. It was described in 2021 and tentatively placed in the family Hyalospheniidae, but it is also attributable to the family Difflugiidae, based solely on morphological characteristics. At present it is placed as incertae sedis within the larger Arcellinida group.

Species
The type species is Erugomicula bidens, previously known as Difflugia bidens. Additionally, based on the similar compressed test shape, the authors that described this genus tentatively place two other taxa of Difflugia inside Erugomicula: the species D. biconcava and the possible junior synonym of that species, D. balcanica. Further molecular studies are required to investigate the composition of the genus.

References

Amoebozoa genera
Taxa described in 2021